Peter Terna Suswam (born 5 September 1991) is a Nigerian footballer who plays for Plateau United as a right back.

Club career
Born in Konshisha, Suswam began his senior career at the age of 16 with Wikki Tourists FC. In 2009, after two seasons, he was sold to fellow Nigeria Premier League team Lobi Stars FC.
 
In the 2010 offseason, Suswam moved abroad and signed with Vitória FC, appearing rarely for the Setúbal-based club over the course of three Primeira Liga campaigns. In late 2013, he trialed for Georgian side FC Guria Lanchkhuti, but left after failing to agree to the economic terms.

International career
Suswam was called up to the Nigeria camp prior to the 2010 FIFA World Cup in South Africa by coach Lars Lagerbäck, after helping the national B-team win the 2010 WAFU Nations Cup. He made his debut on 25 May against Saudi Arabia, but did not make the final cut.

In 2011, Suswam played all the games and minutes with the under-20s in the FIFA World Cup held in Colombia, scoring in a 5–2 group stage win against Croatia as the Super Eagles eventually reached the quarter-finalsl

References

External links

1991 births
Living people
People from Benue State
Nigerian footballers
Association football defenders
Nigeria Professional Football League players
Wikki Tourists F.C. players
Lobi Stars F.C. players
Enyimba F.C. players
Primeira Liga players
Vitória F.C. players
Kategoria Superiore players
FK Kukësi players
Nigeria under-20 international footballers
Nigeria international footballers
2011 CAF U-23 Championship players
Nigerian expatriate footballers
Expatriate footballers in Portugal
Expatriate footballers in Albania
Expatriate footballers in Poland
Nigerian expatriate sportspeople in Portugal
Nigerian expatriate sportspeople in Poland
Stal Rzeszów players
Taraba F.C. players